is a professional Japanese baseball player. He plays pitcher for the Tokyo Yakult Swallows.

He was selected . On October 10, 2018, he was selected Japan national baseball team at the 2018 MLB Japan All-Star Series, but on October 26, 2018, he canceled his participation for Samurai Japan.

References

External links

 NPB.com

1988 births
Living people
Japanese baseball players
Nippon Professional Baseball pitchers
Baseball people from Akita Prefecture
Tokyo Yakult Swallows players